Philophylla caesio is a species of fly in the family Tephritidae, the gall flies. It is found in the  Palearctic. The larvae mine the leaves of Urtica.

References

Trypetinae
Insects described in 1780
Muscomorph flies of Europe